The Wondergirls are a rock supergroup and side project formed in 1999. In its initial, short lived incarnation, the band featured Stone Temple Pilots frontman Scott Weiland, Mark McGrath of Sugar Ray, Ian Astbury of The Cult, Shannon Leto of Thirty Seconds to Mars, Jay Gordon and Ryan Shuck of Orgy and Julien-k, Doug Ardito of Puddle of Mudd, Ken Andrews of Failure, Martyn LeNoble of Porno for Pyros, and Troy Van Leeuwen of Queens of the Stone Age. The Wondergirls recorded two songs, "Let's Go All the Way" and "Drop That Baby" featuring Ashley Hamilton.

The project was revived in 2013, and a new version of "Let's Go All the Way" was included on the Iron Man 3 soundtrack, in which Ashley Hamilton played the character Firepower. The song also features British singer Robbie Williams.

Band members
Ken Andrews – guitar, synth
Ian Astbury – vocals, guitar, harmonica, percussion
Doug Ardito – keyboards
Jay Gordon – vocals, synth
Martyn LeNoble – bass guitar
Shannon Leto – drums
Mark McGrath – vocals
Ryan Shuck – guitar
Troy Van Leeuwen – guitar
Scott Weiland – vocals, keyboards
Ashley Hamilton  - vocals
Chris Lloyd  - guitar

References

Alternative rock groups from California
Hard rock musical groups from California
Musical groups established in 1999
Musical groups from Los Angeles
Rock music supergroups
1999 establishments in California